Hawleyville is an unincorporated community in Page and Taylor counties in the U.S. state of Iowa. The Page County portion of the community is in Nebraska Township, while the Taylor County portion is in Dallas Township.

History
Hawleyville was platted in 1853, and named after James Hawley, a local merchant. Hawleyville's population was 82 in 1902.

References

Unincorporated communities in Page County, Iowa
Unincorporated communities in Taylor County, Iowa
Unincorporated communities in Iowa